Live & Grow is the debut studio album by American rapper Casey Veggies. It was released on September 25, 2015, by Epic Records and Vested in Culture.

Singles
The album's first single, "Backflip" featuring YG and Iamsu!, was released on November 7, 2014. On January 14, 2015, the music video was released for "Backflip" featuring YG and Iamsu!. The album's second single, "Tied Up" featuring Dej Loaf, was released on April 27, 2015. On June 9, 2015, the music video was released for "Tied Up" featuring Dej Loaf.

Track listing

Charts

References

2015 debut albums
Epic Records albums
Albums produced by DJ Mustard
Albums produced by Kane Beatz
Albums produced by Tyler, the Creator
Albums produced by Hit-Boy
Casey Veggies albums